The 1976 South American Artistic Gymnastics Championships were held in Porto Alegre, Brazil, November 12–14, 1976.

Participating nations

Medalists

References

1976 in gymnastics
South American Gymnastics Championships
International gymnastics competitions hosted by Brazil
1976 in Brazilian sport
November 1976 sports events in South America